The 7 cm Gebirgsgeschütz M 75 was a mountain gun used by Austria-Hungary during World War I.  Despite its 7 cm designation it actually fired a  projectile.  The Austro-Hungarian Army rounded up to the nearest centimeter for their designations.  It was obsolete upon introduction as it had a bronze barrel and no recoil mechanism so it had to be relaid after every shot.  The gun had an early form of Krupp horizontal sliding-block breech and it fired separate-loading, bagged charges and projectiles.  Due to its low profile, its breech could recoil into the ground so its angle of elevation was restricted which was a significant handicap for a mountain gun which needed high angles of elevation.  For transport, the Gebirgsgeschütz M 75 could be broken down into two loads.

Photo Gallery

References

External links
 7 cm M 75 GebirgsKanone
 

World War I mountain artillery
70 mm artillery
World War I artillery of Austria-Hungary